Zębowice (German: Zembowitz) is a village in Olesno County, Opole Voivodeship, in southern Poland. It is the seat of the gmina (administrative district) called Gmina Zębowice.

The village has a population of 1,500. 44% of the population belong to the German minority. Zębowice has the largest proportion of Germans in Poland.

References

Villages in Olesno County